Edward Hunt (1792–1866) was a businessman and politician who migrated from Great Britain to Australia and made his career in Sydney.

Life and career

Edward Hunt was born in London, England. He was trained as a cabinet maker and then migrated to Australia, arriving in Sydney on 28 January 1814. In Sydney he had a successful career as a businessman and became a leading manufacturer in the cabinet maker industry.

In 1842, Hunt became a founding member of Sydney City Council and in 1858 was appointed to the New South Wales Legislative Council.

On 20 June 1821, Hunt married Hannah Padgett Mason in St John's Church, Parramatta. Two daughters, both named Hannah, are recorded: the first was born 1825 and died 1828, the second born 1828. Hunt and his wife had six children in all.

From 1847–49, Hunt built a fine residence called Hampton Villa in Grafton Street, Balmain. He died in this house in December 1866. The house was later rented by Henry Parkes from 1888–1892. It has a state heritage listing.

References

1792 births
1866 deaths
Members of the New South Wales Legislative Council
Sydney City Councillors
19th-century Australian politicians